RPS Leyte (PS-30) was a  of the Philippine Navy. She was decommissioned from the U.S. Navy and transferred to the Philippine Navy in July 1948 and renamed Leyte. The ship was decommissioned from the Philippine Navy in 1978 after she ran aground and was damaged beyond repair.

History
Commissioned in the US Navy as USS PCE-885 in 1945, and was decommissioned after World War II.

She was then transferred and commissioned into the Philippine Naval Patrol (currently Philippine Navy) and was renamed RPS Leyte (PS-29) in 1948. She was stricken in 1978 after being grounded near Wallace Air Station in Poro Point, La Union.

Grounding
After undergoing repairs at the Cavite Naval Dockyard in 1978, she was immediately assigned to escort RPS Ang Pangulo, the presidential yacht, which was docked at San Fernando, La Union after being used by President Ferdinand Marcos in a trip to Baguio City. Without undergoing sea trials and with an impending storm, Leyte proceeded to La Union. Caught in the storm and radar-less, one of her engines failed, but she still proceeded to her destination. Upon nearing the area of the Wallace Air Station, she found herself parallel with the coastline, and was hit by a huge wave that threw the ship into the rocky coast off Wallace Air Station. Grounded, her crew was secured from the waves and no fatalities were reported.

The Philippine Navy was unable to recover the ship, and she was stricken in the same year.

Technical details
Originally the ship was armed with one 3"/50 caliber dual purpose gun, three twin Bofors 40 mm guns, five 20 mm  Oerlikon guns, 1 Hedgehog depth charge projector, four depth charge projectiles (K-guns) and two depth charge tracks.

There were slight differences between the BRP Leyte as compared to some of her sister ships in the Philippine Navy, since her previous configuration was as a patrol craft escort, while the others are configured as minesweepers and patrol craft escort rescue ships.

References

External links
 Philippine Defense Forum
 Philippine Navy @ Hazegray.org
 DLSU ROTC
 Opus224's Unofficial Philippine Defense Page
 NavSource Online: Patrol Craft Escort Photo Archive

PCE-842-class patrol craft
Ships built in Portland, Oregon
1944 ships
PCE-842-class patrol craft of the Philippine Navy
Miguel Malvar-class corvettes